Pulimangalam is a village in the Papanasam taluk of Thanjavur district, Tamil Nadu, India.

Demographics 

As per the 2001 census, Pulimangalam had a total population of 720 with 355 males and 365 females. The sex ratio was 1028. The literacy rate was 75.82.

References 

 

Villages in Thanjavur district